Bangladesh–Sierra Leone relations refer to the bilateral relations between Bangladesh and Sierra Leone. The relations between the two countries have been largely influenced by the contribution of Bangladesh forces as part of United Nations Peace Keeping mission in Sierra Leone.

High level visits 
In 2003, then president of Sierra Leone Ahmad Tejan Kabbah paid an official visit to Bangladesh.

Bangladesh forces in Sierra Leone 
Bangladeshi peace keepers played an important role in fighting the rebels during the Sierra Leone Civil War as part of United Nations Mission in Sierra Leone. The peace keepers have also made vital contributions in rebuilding the nation after the civil war and building several important infrastructure. Describing the Bangladeshi peace keepers' contribution, Former Sierra Leone President Ahmad Kabbah said,

Social development 
Bangladeshi NGOs including BRAC are operating in Sierra Leone and are working in the areas of microfinance, agricultural development etc.

Investment 
Sierra Leone has sought Bangladeshi investments especially in garment, textile and agricultural sectors. There have been major investments in Sierra Leone by Bangladeshi companies in the agricultural sector, the most notable being Bangladesh based Bengal Agro Limited which has invested $50 million and has set up a rubber processing plant in Sierra Leone which is the first of its kind in West Africa.

See also  
 Foreign relations of Bangladesh
 Foreign relations of Sierra Leone

References 

Sierra Leone
Bilateral relations of Sierra Leone
Sierra Leone
Sierra Leone and the Commonwealth of Nations